The following is a list of Portuguese bands by alphabetical order.

#
2B

A
The Act-Ups
Aenima
Ala dos Namorados
Alexander Search
Alma Lusa
Os Amigos
Amor Electro
Anarchicks
Aqui d'El-Rock
Ava Inferi
Os Azeitonas

B
Banda do Casaco
Beautify Junkyards
Best Youth
Bizarra Locomotiva
Blasted Mechanism
Blind Zero
Brigada Victor Jara
Bunnyranch
Buraka Som Sistema

C
Capitão Fausto
Clã
Cool Hipnoise

D
D.A.M.A
D'ZRT
Da Vinci
Da Weasel
Dæmonarch
DarkWaters
Dazkarieh
Dead Combo
Dealema
Delfins
Deolinda
Doce
Dopo
Droban-Apherna

E
Easyway
Expensive Soul

F
Fingertips
Flor-de-Lis
Fonzie

G
Gemini
The Gift
The Gilbert's Feed Band
GNR

H
Hands on Approach
Heróis do Mar
Holocausto Canibal
Holy Nothing
Homens da Luta
Humanos
Hyubris

I
Icon & The Black Roses
If Lucy Fell

J
Just Girls

K
Karetus

L
The Lemon Lovers
Linda Martini
Loto
Le Bruit

M
Madredeus
Mão Morta
Micro Audio Waves
Moonspell
More Than a Thousand
MTM

N
A Naifa
Nonstop
Norton

O
Orelha Negra
Ornatos Violeta

P
Papercutz
Paranormal Attack
The Parkinsons
PAUS
Petrus Castrus
Pluto
Pólo Norte
Primitive Reason

Q
Quarteto 1111
Quinta do Bill
Qwentin

S
Santamaria
Scar for Life
Sean Riley & The Slowriders
Sensible Soccers
Sétima Legião
Silence 4
Soulbizness
Spartak!
Stealing Orchestra

T
Tara Perdida
Tarantula
Taxi
Telectu
Terra a Terra
ThanatoSchizO
Toranja

U
UHF
Underground Sound of Lisbon
Urban Tales

V
Verdes Anos

W
Wet Bed Gang
Wraygunn

X
X-Wife
Xutos e Pontapés

Z
ZEM

See also

List of Portuguese singers
List of Portuguese musicians

Portuguese musical groups